Bevan H. Morris (born 3 March 1949 in Adelaide) was the president of Maharishi University of Management in Fairfield, Iowa, for 36 years and a founder of the Natural Law Party.

Early life and education
Morris received his B.A. and M.A. in psychology and philosophy from Gonville and Caius College of Cambridge University, England. He earned a master's degree and a PhD in the Science of Creative Intelligence from Maharishi European Research University (MERU) in Vlodrop, Netherlands. Morris also holds a Doctorate of World Peace from MERU in Switzerland.

Career

Educator
In September, 1980 Morris was appointed president and chairman of the board of trustees of the Maharishi International University, which was renamed Maharishi University of Management (MUM) in 1995. During his tenure, there was expansion of the university campus, and accreditation through the PhD level. In the 1994, he was reported to be the lowest-paid college president in Iowa, receiving an annual salary of $9,000. He is also on the board of trustees of the Maharishi School of the Age of Enlightenment. Morris became the emeritus chairman of the board of trustees of MUM in 2009 after having served as chairman for 30 years. He continues to serve as its president. Morris is the International President of Maharishi Vedic Universities, a network of institutions in Europe, Asia, Africa, and South America. In March 2012, Morris toured 14 African countries, including Kenya, to promote Consciousness Based Education. He retired as president in 2016.

Politician
Morris was a founder and national chairman of the U.S. Natural Law Party (NLP). He took a leave of absence from MUM to oversee John Hagelin's first campaign for U.S. President, in 1992 and praised Hagelin's "highly coherent brain". Morris was described, in 1992, as the party's spokesman on education. He was listed in 1993 as a candidate in the Commonwealth of Australia legislative election and Morris was reported to be the leader of the Australian NLP in 1997.

Other
From 1975 to 1979, Morris was the international coordinator for MERU. In 1984, Morris toured the United States seeking practitioners of the TM-Sidhi program to form a group in Fairfield, Iowa. Morris was appointed chairman of the Maharishi Council of Supreme Intelligence of Age of Enlightenment in 1987.

Personal life
As of 2009, Morris was living in Adelaide, Australia.

References

Living people
1949 births
People from Adelaide
Alumni of Gonville and Caius College, Cambridge
Heads of universities and colleges in the United States
Natural Law Party (United States) politicians